Leeds City Schools is the school district of Leeds, Alabama.

The district states that unless a parent of a child informs the school principal on an annual basis, the district will perform corporal punishment on a student if the student commits certain infractions.

Schools
Leeds Primary School
Leeds Elementary School
Leeds Middle School 
Leeds High School

References

External links

 

School districts in Alabama
Education in Jefferson County, Alabama
Education in St. Clair County, Alabama
Education in Shelby County, Alabama